Vicious Pink was a synth-pop duo formed in Leeds, England in 1981.

History 

With a catchy sound and a penchant for highly provocative and sexualized lyrics, the band's music was aimed toward clubs rather than commercial hits. Vicious Pink consisted of two members, English/French singer Josephine Warden and keyboardist Brian Moss. The duo began as backing vocalists for Soft Cell, then known as Vicious Pink Phenomena.

Vicious Pink are remembered for four dance singles: "8:15 to Nowhere", "Cccan't You See", and "Fetish" produced by Tony Mansfield of New Musik fame. Their last single "Take Me Now" was produced by Gary Moberley . 

The band also backed Soft Cell at The Warehouse in Leeds. The American owner of The Warehouse, Mike Wiand, was their manager. Wiand was also a key factor in the success of the 1980s dance track "Let the Music Play" by Shannon, which was released in the UK on his Warehouse Records label. Vicious Pink played live at The Ritz in New York in December 1984.

Vicious Pink were able to briefly attain a cult level of success without ever breaking into the mainstream.  Although they had started releasing music in 1982, they failed to attract much attention until the release of the single "Cccan't You See" (UK No. 67) and its instrumental B-side "8:15 to Nowhere" in 1984. Over the next two years, both sides of this single accrued play in clubs on both sides of the Atlantic.

In 1983, the duo recorded two unreleased demo, Blue and The Tape Gallery, and a self-titled album released in 1986, after they had ceased recording. This album was a collection of previously released singles.

Warden later married a London-based music lawyer, and Moss continued his music career; he is now the keyboardist for the artist, Mirazma.

In 2015, Vicious Pink released various mixes of "Kings of the Mountains", a 2012 track.

In 2019, Vicious Pink described "Organiclon Sentient Ship" as new music.

In 2022, Vicious Pink released the double LP West View, containing remasters and demos.

Discography

Albums
 Vicious Pink (1986)
 West View (2022)

Singles
 "My Private Tokyo" (1982)
 "Je T'aime" (1983) (UK #84)
 "8:15 to Nowhere" (1984)
 "Cccan't You See" (1984) (UK #67)
 "Fetish" / "Spooky" (1985) (UK #87)
 "Cccan't You See" (Remix) (1985) (UK #95)
 "Take Me Now" (1986)

References

External links
 Brian Moss's current project

English electronic music duos
English synth-pop groups
English new wave musical groups
British synth-pop new wave groups
Female-fronted musical groups
Male–female musical duos
New wave duos
Musical groups from Leeds
Musical groups established in 1981
Musical groups disestablished in 1986